Davison may refer to:
Davison (surname)

Places in the United States
Davison, Michigan, a suburb of Flint
Davison Township, Michigan
Davison Freeway, a highway in Detroit, Michigan
Davison County, South Dakota

Other uses
Davison Design & Development, an invention promotion firm
Davison's, department stores
USS Davison (DD-618), a US Navy destroyer
Davison High School, a girls' secondary school in England

See also
Davisson (disambiguation)
Davidson (disambiguation)